KEO is a Cypriot beer. It is a light straw-colored lager with a thick head, and is sometimes compared to a pilsner in taste.

The beer is brewed in Limassol, in Cyprus. The beer won the 1987 brewing industry world bottled lager competition gold medal. In 2010, KEO held a 32.4% share of the island's beer market.

Awards
Keo beer was awarded a gold medal by the Brewing Industry International Awards.

Controversy
In 2010 the appearance of the beer in a pornographic American film sparked a reaction by the largest shareholder in the company, the Church of Cyprus.

References

External links 
 

Companies based in Limassol
Beer in Cyprus
Cypriot brands